Lieutenant colonel Henry Smith, known popularly as Henry “Jullundur” Smith, (1859-1948), was an Irish ophthalmologist who served in the Indian Medical Service (IMS), mostly in Jullundur, Punjab. In 1905 he published a landmark paper titled “Extraction of cataract in the capsule”. Smith's operation, an operation for removing cataracts with the capsule intact, is named for him. A description of Smith is given in Derrick Vail's “The Man With the Cigar” (1973).

Early life and education
Henry Smith, also known as Harry, was born in Clogher, County Tyrone in 1859. He attended Queen's College, Galway, from where he graduated with first class honours.

Career
In 1890 he joined the Indian Medical Service, and was stationed at Amritsar and Jullundur, Punjab, where he became known as "Jullundur Smith", acting as superintendent of the local jail and performing both stone and eye surgery. During the cooler seasons, he could perform up to 100 cataract operations per day. He popularised the intracapsular cataract extraction.

Later life
In 1921 he retired and remained in India until 1925, when he returned to Clogher, County Tyrone.

Personal and family
In 1898, Smith married an Indian Medical Service colleague. They had two sons.

Death and legacy
He died in 1859. The Indian Pioneer wrote: "He was big, mentally, morally and physically and he operated on thousands upon thousands for two great Indian afflictions, cataract and stone. India mourns his going, the world honours him."

Smith is considered an ophthalmology pioneer of the IMS, along with Herbert Herbert. A description of Smith is given in Derrick Vail's “The Man With the Cigar” (1973).

References

British surgeons
1948 deaths
1859 births
British people in colonial India
British ophthalmologists
Indian Medical Service officers